FreshBooks is accounting software operated by 2ndSite Inc. primarily for small and medium-sized businesses. It is a web-based software as a service (SaaS) model, that can be accessed through a desktop or mobile device.

The company was founded in 2003 and is based in Toronto, Canada.

History
FreshBooks was founded in 2004 by Mike McDerment, Levi Cooperman, and Joe Sawada in Toronto, Ontario. McDerment incorporated a second company, BillSpring in January 2015 to work on new product development. It was rolled back into FreshBooks as an updated interface in 2016.

Initially FreshBooks functioned like an electronic invoicing program targeting IT professionals. After the release of the new interface, the initial release of FreshBooks was referred to as "FreshBooks Classic." FreshBooks Classic was discontinued in 2022 after migrating users to the new platform. FreshBooks Classic's front-end application was built in PHP, and the backend services were built in Python while the new FreshBooks uses the same backend services with a JavaScript single-page application.

Product
FreshBooks offers a subscription-based product that includes invoicing, accounts payable, expense tracking, time tracking, retainers, fixed asset depreciation, purchase orders, payroll integrations, mileage tracking, double-entry accounting, and industry-standard business and management reporting. All financial data is stored in the cloud on a single unified ledger, allowing users to access the same set of books regardless of location on desktop and mobile. It offers a free API that enables customers and 3rd-party software vendors to integrate external applications with FreshBooks. FreshBooks also supports multiple tax rates and currencies. It also incorporates a payroll feature and a projects feature. The software is priced on a pay-per-use recurring monthly fee.

FreshBooks supports country specific tax calculation in Canada, the United States and Britain. GST and HST in Canada, sales taxes in the United States, and MTD in the UK are supported by FreshBooks.

Operations
FreshBooks has its headquarters in Toronto, Canada with operations in North America, Europe and Australia. Founder Mike McDerment was the chief executive officer of the company from 2003 until 2021, when he stepped down and was replaced by Don Epperson, but stayed as the executive chair. Don Epperson had previously joined FreshBooks as executive director in 2019.

Funding
FreshBooks was initially self-funded. In 2014, the company raised a Series A venture investment of $30 million led by the venture capital firm Oak Investment Partners, with participation by Georgian Partners and Atlas Venture. In 2017, FreshBooks announced that it raised another $43 million in funding from Accomplice, Georgian Partners and Oak Investment Partners.

On August 10, 2021, FreshBooks announced that it had secured $80.75 million in Series E funding and $50 million in debt financing. FreshBooks also reached a valuation of more than $1 billion.

See also
 Comparison of accounting software
 Comparison of time tracking software

References

Accounting software
Web applications
Cloud applications